Three-cushion billiards, also called three-cushion carom, is a form of carom billiards. A point is scored for each successful carom. In most shots the cue ball hits the object balls one time each, although hitting them any number of times is allowed as long as both are hit. The cue ball may contact the cushions before or after hitting the first object ball. It does not have to contact three different cushions as long as it has been in contact with any cushion at least three times in total.

History 
Three-cushion dates to the 1870s, and while the origin of the game is not entirely known, it evolved from one-cushion billiards, which in turn developed from straight rail billiards for the same reason that balkline also arose from straight rail.

It is undisputed that Wayman Crow McCreery, the Internal Revenue Collector of the Port of St. Louis, Missouri, born June 14, 1851 in St. Louis, popularized the game. At least one publication categorically states he invented the game as well.

The first three-cushion billiards tournament took place January 14–31, 1878 in C. E. Mussey's billiard room in St. Louis, with McCreery a participant. The tournament was won by New Yorker Leon Magnus. The high run for the tournament was just 6 points, and the high average a .75. The game was infrequently played prior to 1907, with many top carom players of the era voicing their dislike of it. However, after the introduction of the Lambert Trophy in 1907, the game became increasingly popular both in the United States and internationally.

By 1924, three-cushion had become so popular that two giants in other billiard disciplines agreed to take up the game especially for a challenge match. On September 22, 1924 Willie Hoppe, the world's balkline champion (who later took up three-cushion with a passion), and Ralph Greenleaf, the world's straight pool title holder, played a well advertised, multi-day  to 600 . Hoppe was the eventual winner with a final score of 600–527. The game's decline in the United States began in 1952 when Hoppe, then 51-time billiards champion, announced his retirement. Over time, three-cushion completely supplanted balkline billiards, once the world championship carom game.

Three-cushion retains great popularity in parts of Europe, Asia, and Latin America, and is the most popular carom billiards game played in the United States today, where pool is far more widespread.  The game's slow resurgence in United States popularity is due in part to the introduction of the Sang Lee International Open tournament in Flushing, New York in 2005, with first-place prize money up to US$25,000. The game has also seen increased coverage in cue sports publications based in the United States, such as Billiards Digest and Pool & Billiard Magazine.

Records
Three-cushion billiards is a very difficult game. Averaging one point per  is usually national-level play, and averaging 1.5 or more is world-class play. An average of 1 means that for every turn at the table, a player point success rate is 50%. An average of 2 means a success rate of roughly 67%.

The high run at three-cushion billiards for many years was 25, set over two games (fourteen and out and starting with eleven in the next game) by the American Willie Hoppe in 1918 during an exhibition in San Francisco. In 1968 Raymond Ceulemans improved the record to 26 in a match in the Simonis Cup tournament. In 1993 Junichi Komori set the record to 28 in a Dutch league match, a feat repeated by Ceulemans in 1998 in the same league. In 2012 Roland Forthomme tied the record in Zundert. In the 2013 European Championships in Brandenburg, Germany, Frederic Caudron became the fourth member of the "28" club. Ceulemans reputedly had a high run of 32 in a non-tournament, non-exhibition match. The highest run so far in a World Cup match is 24, set by Jérémy Bury on 7 September 2013 in Guri, South Korea (see result sheet on the right).

When allowing for interruptions by opponents starting new games, the current record high run is 34 by the Dutchman Dick Jaspers: in his 2008 European Championship Final match against the Swede Torbjörn Blomdahl, played in three games of 15 points each, he ended Game One by going 13 and out, ran 15 and out in the only inning of Game Two (started by Blomdahl), and ran six in his first inning of Game Three.

The best game at the standard 50 points in a league is six innings (8.333 average) by Eddy Merckx (:4-9-26-7-0-4) in the German Bundesliga in 2011. The best such game in a tournament is nine innings (5.555 average) by Torbjörn Blomdahl in 2000, while South Korean and later U.S. national champion Sang Lee scored 50 points in four innings (: 19-11-9-11, a 12.5 average) in a  game at Sang Lee Billiards in Queens, New York.

The best tournament match average is 5.625 (45 in eight innings over three games; i.e. only five misses), scored by Dick Jaspers in the above-mentioned European Cup finals in Florange, France, in 2008. His opponent Blomdahl averaged 3.0 in his losing effort. The highest average at an international tournament is 2.537 (345 caramboles in 136 innings) by Dick Jaspers in 2002 at a seven-match Crystal Kelly tournament in Monaco, while Jaspers reached a record average of 2.666 (200 caramboles in 75 innings) at a four-match national tournament in Veldhoven in 2005.

Alfredo de Oro from Cuba was won 20 World Three-cushion Championships

Raymond Ceulemans from Belgium has won 21 UMB World Three-cushion Championships.

Governing bodies
The principal governing body of the sport is the Union Mondiale de Billard (UMB). It had been staging world three-cushion championships since the late 1920s. It is a member organization of the World Confederation of Billiard Sports. From 1985 to 1999, the Billiards World Cup Association (BWA) organized the Three-Cushion World Cup with UMB, but later shut down due to financial problems, with UMB assuming full responsibility for the tournament.

In popular culture 
The game also features prominently in the 2007 Goya Award-winning Spanish film Seven Billiard Tables, about a woman who inherits a troubled billiard hall and is searching for her missing husband.

See also
UMB World Three-cushion Championship
CEB European Three-cushion Championship
Three-Cushion World Cup

References

External links
 Official World Record List of the UMB

 
Carom billiards
Sports originating in the United States